The MacArthur Bridge is a truss bridge that connects St. Louis, Missouri and East St. Louis, Illinois over the Mississippi River. The bridge was initially called the "St. Louis Municipal Bridge" and known popularly as the "Free Bridge" due to the original lack of tolls. Tolls were added for auto traffic beginning in 1932. In 1942, the bridge was renamed for Douglas MacArthur.  The bridge was constructed to break the monopoly of the Terminal Railroad Association, which controlled two other bridges at St. Louis and charged what were viewed as unreasonable tolls.

Upon completion, the structure was the largest double-deck steel bridge in the world.

History 
Following a 1906 Congressional bill authorizing the City of St. Louis to build a new Mississippi River Bridge, bonds were issued for an initial amount of $3.5 million.  Construction on the bridge began 1909, however,  money ran out before the bridge approaches could be finished.  This led to a second bond issuance of $2.75 million in 1914, and the bridge did not open until 1917, when it was first opened to automobile traffic.  Railroad traffic would not use the bridge's lower deck until 1928.  The bridge was built by Missouri Valley Bridge & Iron Co. and American Bridge Company, with the design completed by Boller & Hodge.

From 1929 through 1955, the MacArthur Bridge carried U.S. Highway 66 until the completion of the nearby Poplar Street Bridge.  From 1947 to 1974, U.S. Highway 460 crossed the bridge, terminating on the west side of the bridge. In 1981 the bridge was closed to vehicles because of pavement deterioration and the eastern ramp approaches were torn out. The bridge is now in use only by railroads. The disused vehicle deck has been removed.

In 1989, the Terminal Railroad Association of St. Louis acquired the MacArthur Bridge from the City of St. Louis in exchange for the title to the Eads Bridge. The Eads bridge, one of the primary reasons for the TRRA's original formation, had become obsolete for modern-day rail traffic due to the height restrictions it placed on rail cars.

By 2007, only about 30% of the total deck reserved for automobile use had been removed.  Most of the removed sections were on the East St. Louis side.  The western ramp was relinquished to Ralston Purina and turned into a parking lot.  In 2013 the TRRA began removing all of the auto deck over the river.  By late 2014, the vehicle deck on the bridge proper had been removed, and work was progressing onto the western approach.

The MacArthur Bridge continues to be the vital railroad link connecting west to east for a large number of commodities, and bulk cargo. In 2012, it was the 17th busiest railroad bridge in the United States carrying roughly 40 trains per day.

In 2022, the Terminal Railroad began a $57.3 million rehabilitation project on the bridge. The project will include replacing the 1912 main span girders and a reconstruction of the Broadway truss in downtown St. Louis. The project will allow longer and wider railroad cars on the approaches and the new girders will extend the life of the bridge to 2085.

Gallery

See also 
 
 
 
 
 List of crossings of the Upper Mississippi River

References

External links 

Bridges over the Mississippi River
Bridges on U.S. Route 66
Bridges in St. Louis
Bridges completed in 1917
Steel bridges in the United States
Truss bridges in the United States
Railroad bridges in Illinois
Railroad bridges in Missouri
Former road bridges in the United States
Road bridges in Illinois
Road bridges in Missouri
Bridges in St. Clair County, Illinois
East St. Louis, Illinois
Former toll bridges in Illinois
Former toll bridges in Missouri
U.S. Route 66 in Missouri
U.S. Route 66 in Illinois
Interstate vehicle bridges in the United States